Ian Prowse (born 31 January 1991) is an Irish former first-class cricketer.

Prowse was born in Northern Ireland at Lisburn in January 1991. He was educated in England at Hampton School, before going up to Loughborough University. While studying at Loughborough, he made two appearances in first-class cricket for Loughborough MCCU against Hampshire and Nottinghamshire in 2015. He scored 23 runs in his two matches, with a high score of 15, in addition to taking 2 wickets with his mixture of right-arm medium pace and off break bowling.

References

External links

1991 births
Living people
People from Lisburn
People educated at Hampton School
Alumni of Loughborough University
Irish cricketers
Cricketers from Northern Ireland
Loughborough MCCU cricketers